Ocna Șugatag is a commune in Maramureș County, Maramureș, Romania. It is composed of four villages: Breb (Bréb), Hoteni (Hotinka), Ocna Șugatag, and Sat-Șugatag (Falusugatag). A health resort, it is well known for its salt water.

At the 2011 census, 89.2% of inhabitants were Romanians, 8.3% Hungarians and 2.3% Roma.

Natives
 Marga Barbu

References

Communes in Maramureș County
Localities in Romanian Maramureș
Spa towns in Romania
Mining communities in Romania